Alairac is a commune in the Aude department in the Occitanie region of southern France.

The inhabitants of the commune are known as Alairacois, or Alairacoises.

Geography
The commune is in the urban area of Carcassonne and is located on a hillock at the foot of the Malepère mountain range. Alairac is a traditional circulade village dating to 1000AD. The commune has been part of the agglomeration community called Carcassonne Agglo since 1 January 2010.

The commune is located some 80 km south-east of Toulouse and only 6 km south-west of Carcassonne.  The Motorway E80 (A61) passes across the northern tip of the commune but has no exit. The commune can be reached by Road D18 from Carcassonne, which passes in a south-westerly direction through the heart of the commune towards Cailhau. Road D211 also passes through the commune from Arzens in the west to Lavalette in the east passing to the north of Alairac village. The village can be reached by a number of local roads from both the D211 and the D18. The commune is both farmland and forest with two small hamlets: Galet and Les Rougeats.

Several streams pass through the commune. In the east the Ruisseau Saint Pierre forms the eastern border of the commune, the Ruisseau de Bonne Mere forms the southern boundary, and the Ruisseau du Sout forms the western boundary. Inside the commune there are several streams with the Ruisseau de Celule Ou Gautel passing near the village. All the streams eventually flow into the river Aude which continues east into the Mediterranean Sea.

Neighbouring communes and towns

Geology, topography and hydrography
The village overlooks the plain where the Canal du Midi to the north of the commune towards Carcassonne and the view extends over a panorama limited to the north by the Montagne Noire (Black Mountain). To the north-east is the city of Carcassonne and to the south the Malepère mountain range covered in oak forest, the domain of wild boar and mushroom collectors.

Climate
The village has an oceanic climate with a strong Mediterranean influence. This area is dominated by Holly Oak forests which makes it suitable for the cultivation of the grapevines. The summers are temperate and the winters mild.

History
The first written record of the castle appeared in 1063: the time of the probable construction of the circulade. The area belonged to the Count of Foix, the first of which was Roger I de Foix who was the second son of Bernard-Roger, Count of Bigorre. Over the years, he exchanged the County of Foix with the Viscount of Carcassonne several times to the Trencavel family.

From the 11th century, the village was traversed by one of the paths to Saint Jacques de Compostela called "Path of the Pyrenean Piedmont". This pilgrimage continued until the 18th century.

During the Albigensian Crusade at Easter 1210, Simon de Montfort besieged the castle at Alairac for eleven days at which the people, fearing they may have to surrender, fled by night. In 1309, the last known Cathar perfect, Guillaume Bélibaste, fled Catalonia with Philippe of Alayrac. The latter, on his return home after ten years of exile, was probably captured and burned.

On hearing the sound of an approaching large company from Routiers in 1366, the officers of the Bailiwick of Carcassonne ordered the inhabitants of the castle at Alairac — which belonged to Jean d'Armagnac — to fortify it and destroy the surrounding area. Having failed to execute the order, the Viscount angrily set fire to the castle which was completely burned. Later, the Count of Armagnac ceded the land of Alairac to the Marquis of Mirepoix in 1404.

The lordship was sold at the beginning of the 18th  century to a citizen of Carcassonne. This lordship was extinguished by the Revolution in 1789.

During the First World War from 1914 to 1918, the village lost nineteen people, whose names are inscribed on the memorial. Every year on 11 November, this sacrifice is remembered by reading their names during a ceremony attended by schoolchildren.

During the Algerian War, many young people from Alairac were called to fight. One of them was killed. Every 19 March the laying of wreaths takes place to commemorate the date the Évian Accords came into force.

Heraldry

Administration

List of Successive Mayors of Alairac

Population

Economy
Viticulture: Malepère (AOC)

Culture and heritage

Civil heritage
The Circulade of Alairac with its circular boulevard called Rond Saint-Germain: the heart of the village
The War memorial surmounted by a Gallic rooster on which is inscribed the names of the twenty young men of the village who were killed during the wars of the 20th century
A Courtyard shaded by acacias at the primary school dating from 1935
The village is crossed by one of the roads of the Way of Saint James leading to Saint-Jacques de Compostela

Religious heritage
The commune has several religious buildings and structures that are registered as historical monuments:
The Parish Church of Saint Germain (14th century) with an octagonal bell tower which originally served as a Fortified tower. The Church contains two items that are registered as historical objects:
A Chalice with Paten (19th century)
A Chalice with Paten (19th century)
The Catuffe Cross (1645) on the Chamin des Castelles.
The Alairac Cross (17th century), a Saint Germain style round cross.

Gallery

Culture and festivals
The Alain Cazalis Library is associated with the library of the Aude
In March there is Printemps de notes (Spring notes), an artistic and musical festival of Alairac in Malepère
In May De circulade en circulade is hosted, comprising plays, lectures, and local bands together with fourteen other circulade villages of Aude.
On the first Sunday of June there is a hunting feast with a Mass for Saint Hubert to bless the packs of dogs
In the last weekend of July there is the village fete

Children's activities
There is a hall for teenagers (12–17 years old) organised by the CIAS of Carcassonne. This activity is supervised by Mathieu Bruno the organiser.

Facilities

Education
In total one hundred and fifty children were enrolled in the Alairac public school in 2012 which has both a primary school built in 1935 and a kindergarten which was built in 2002
From eleven years old most of the children go to the Varsovie College at Carcassonne.

Sports
Football club of the Malepère in association with Lavalette and Roullens
Tennis accord between the Malepère and Alairac, Caux-et-Sauzens, Preixan, Arzens, and  Lavalette.
Cycling Club
Motorcycle club, with the Escande track and the motocross international circuit at Escande

Notable people linked to the commune
Philippe of Alayrac, companion of the last Cathar Perfect, Guillaume Bélibaste
André Mouls, playwright and Occitan poet
Alain Cazalis (1950-2012), Deputy Mayor, Deputy for Culture, defender of "rural culture", including the creator of the Spring notes festival and initiator of the association De circulade en circulade
Roger Adivèze former regional councilor, officer of the Legion of Honour, mayor between 1971 and 2020 and vice president of the Carcassonne Agglo since January 2010, and also Chairman of the management centre of the territorial public service of Aude.

See also
 Communes of the Aude department

External links
 Alairac official website 
 Alairac page on the circulades website
Alairac on Géoportail, National Geographic Institute (IGN) website 
Alairac on the 1750 Cassini Map

References

Communes of Aude